6 Convent Place, colloquially known in Gibraltar as "Number 6", is the headquarters of His Majesty's Government of Gibraltar and the office of the Chief Minister. It is located opposite The Convent, the Governor of Gibraltar's official residence.

Gibraltar's Economic Planning and Statistics Office is located in the building.

References

Government of Gibraltar
Buildings and structures in Gibraltar
Government buildings in Gibraltar